IRAC is an acronym that generally stands for: Issue, Rule, Application, and Conclusion. It functions as a methodology for legal analysis. The IRAC format is mostly used in hypothetical questions in law school and bar exams.

Sections of an IRAC

Issue
In the IRAC method of legal analysis, the "issue" is simply a legal question that must be answered. An issue arises when the facts of a case present a legal ambiguity that must be resolved in a case, and legal researchers (whether paralegals, law students, lawyers, or judges) typically resolve the issue by consulting legal precedent (existing statutes, past cases, court rules, etc.). For example, suppose the law required that a lawsuit had to be filed within one year of an allegedly negligent act. If the 365th day falls on a Sunday, then the issue would be whether or not the law counts weekends as part of its computation of the one-year time limit. Would the plaintiff have to file by the preceding Friday? Would the law excuse the weekend and consider a Monday filing to be timely, even though that would technically be the 366th day? In order to answer the legal question (issue), one would move to the next letter in the IRAC acronym: "R" - which stands for Rule.

Rule
The Rule section of an IRAC follows the statement of the issue at hand. The rule section of an IRAC is the statement of the rules pertinent in deciding the issue stated. Rules in a common law jurisdiction derive from court case precedent and statute. The information included in the rules section depends heavily on the specificity of the question at hand. If the question states a specific jurisdiction then it is proper to include rules specific to that jurisdiction. Another distinction often made in the rule section is a clear delineation of rules that are in holding, and binding based on the authority of the hierarchy of the court, being ratio decidendi, and being the majority ruling, or simply persuasive.  There are occasions when rules are adopted on the basis they are the only clearly articulated rules on the issue, in spite of being minority decisions, obiter dicta, and from lower courts, in other jurisdictions, which have never been contradicted.

The rules help make a correct legal analysis of the issue at hand using the facts of the case. The rules section needs to be a legal summary of all the rules used in the analysis and is often written in a manner which paraphrases or otherwise analytically condenses information into applicable rules.

Application
The Application (or Analysis) section of an IRAC applies the rules developed in the rules section to the specific facts of the issue at hand. This section uses only the rules stated in the rules section of the IRAC and usually utilizes all the rules stated including exceptions as is required by the analysis. It is important in this section to apply the rules to the facts of the case and explain or argue why a particular rule applies or does not apply in the case presented. The application/analysis section is the most important section of an IRAC because it develops the answer to the issue at hand. It is useful to think like a lawyer, arguing the facts of the matter from both sides while sticking to the rules before coming to a decision.

Conclusion
The Conclusion section of an IRAC directly answers the question presented in the issue section of the IRAC. It is important for the methodology of the IRAC that the conclusion section of the IRAC not introduce any new rules or analysis. This section restates the issue and provides the final answer.
Conclusion is a vital process where the final calls are distributed upon the previous cases and are redefined by the judge.

The Role of Facts
The facts of a case are central to every step in the IRAC.  It is from the facts that the issues are identified. It is the facts that lead to the identification of the most appropriate rules, and the rules which lead to the most useful way of construing the facts.  Analysis requires the interpretation of facts and rules. The conclusion is a decision based on the application of the rules to the facts for each issue.

Criticism
IRAC has many proponents and opponents. The main arguments of the proponents of the IRAC methodology say it reduces legal reasoning to the application of a formula that helps organize the legal analysis. Since an organized legal analysis is easier to follow and reduces errors in reasoning, therefore, the proponents argue that the IRAC is a very useful tool.

The opponents of the IRAC fall into two categories. The first category are those who object to using an IRAC because of its strict and unwieldy format. Most of these critics offer an alternative version of the IRAC such as MIRAT, IDAR, CREAC, TREACC, CRuPAC, ISAAC and ILAC. Each new iteration is supposed to cure the defects of the IRAC and offer more or less freedom depending upon the format. A very good example of such an alternative format is the CREAC which is said to offer more clarity and congruity. They argue this based upon the repetition of the conclusion in the beginning and the end which is said to leave no doubt as to the final answer and offer congruity to the overall reasoning. It also has an explanation of the rules section which helps delineate rules into stating the rules and explaining the rules for further clarity.

The second category of critics of the IRAC say that it tends to lead to overwriting, and oversimplifying the complexity of proper legal analysis. This group believes that a good legal analysis consists of a thoughtful, careful, well researched essay that is written in a format most amiable to the writer. The importance of an open format amiable to the writer is supposed to let the legal reasoners concentrate on expressing their argument to the best of their abilities instead of concentrating on adhering to a strict format that reduces this focus.

An example IRAC
A generic IRAC on a law school exam would consist of an answer to a question. The following example demonstrates a generic IRAC as an answer to a question.

Person "A" walks into a grocery store and picks up a loaf of bread. He then stuffs the bread beneath his jacket. A security attendant sees him and follows him to the cash register. Person A passes through without stopping to pay for anything. The security attendant stops him at the gate. He detains person A while he interrogates him. Person A is unresponsive and uncooperative and in fact downright hostile to the charges being leveled at him by the security attendant. Person A is held for a period of two hours at the end of which it is found that he had actually put the loaf of bread back and was not stealing. Person A sues the grocery store for false imprisonment. Would person A prevail in court?

Variations
 AFGAN (Application, Facts, Grounds, Answer, Negotiation)
 BaRAC / BRAC (Bold Assertion, Rule, Application, Conclusion)
 CI/REXAC (Conclusion, Introductory/Roadmap (Issue and Rule), Explanation, Application, Conclusion)
 CLEO (Claim, Law, Evaluation, Outcome)
 CRAAC (Conclusion, Rules, Analogous Case (if applicable), Application, Conclusion. This is mostly used for writing assignments.
 CRRACC (Conclusion, Rule, Rule Proof, Application, Counterargument, Conclusion)
 CRAB (Conclusion Rule Analysis Basis)
 CREAC (Conclusion, Rules, Explanation, Application, Conclusion)
 FIRAC (Facts, Issues, Relevant Legal Provisions and Rules, Application of Rules, Conclusion)
 HIRAC (Heading, Issue, Rule, Analysis/Application, Conclusion) 
 IDAR (Issues, Doctrine, Application, Result).
 ILAC (Issue, Law, Application, Conclusion)
 IRAAC (Issue, Rule, Analogous Cases, Application, Conclusion)
 KUWAIT (Konclusion, Utility, Wording, Answer, Initiation, Thoughts)
 TREACC (Topic, Rule, Explanation, Analysis, Counterarguments, Conclusion)
 TRIAccC (Topic, Rule, Issues, Analysis [cases, conclusion], Conclusion)
 TREAT (Thesis, Rule, [Rule] Explanation, [Rule] Application, Thesis)
 TRRAC (Thesis, Rule Statement, Rule Explanation, Application, Conclusion)
TUPAC (Topic, Utility, Proof, Analysis, Conclusion)
 CRuPAC (Conclusion, Rule, Proof, Analysis, Conclusion)
 MIRAT (Material Facts, Issues, Rules, Application, Tentative Conclusion).
 CIRAC (Conclusion, Issue, Rules, Application, Conclusion)
 IPAAC (Issue, Principle, Authority, Application, Conclusion)
 IRREAC (Issue, Rule, Rule Explanation, Application, Conclusion)
 IRACDD (Issue, Rule, Analysis, Conclusion, Defense, Damages).

References

External links
 Legal Reasoning and HIRAC: Australian National University College of Law
 Explanation of IRAC
 In Defense of IRAC - a rejoinder to "Why IRAC sucks"
Dondal J. Kochan, "Thinking" in a Deweyan Perspective: The Law School Exam as a Case Study for Thinking in Lawyering, 12  395 (2012).

Irac 
Legal writing